The Kia Stinger is a mid-size liftback manufactured by Kia between 2017 and 2023.

Overview

The Stinger traces its roots to the GT Concept from the 2011 Frankfurt Motor Show and the Kia GT4 Stinger from the 2014 North American International Auto Show. Design work was led by Peter Schreyer and Gregory Guillaume (Kia's Chief Designer) at Kia's European studio in Frankfurt and engineered by former BMW M Vice President of Engineering Albert Biermann, the car was unveiled at the 2017 North American International Auto Show. Biermann is now the executive vice president of performance development and high performance vehicles of the Hyundai Motor Group.

Performance 

For the European and Korean markets, the Stinger is offered with a base 2.2-liter CRDi diesel I4 that produces . GT variants are equipped with Brembo brakes and Michelin tires. The sole transmission is an 8-speed automatic with five driving modes plus paddle-shifters.

The average lateral acceleration recorded in track testing was 0.85 g.

Update 

In August 2020, Kia unveiled a refreshed Stinger that went on sale in South Korea on the third quarter of 2020 and worldwide by the end of year. Styling updates include revised headlights and tail lights, a new 10.25-inch infotainment screen and an additional wheel design.

The Kia Stinger was updated for the British market on 6 January 2021, while the North American model was updated on 16 March 2021, making it one of the first cars to bear the new Kia logo in said region, alongside the Carnival. The Mexican model later arrived on 3 May 2021, also sporting the new Kia logo.

In December 2022, Kia announced that the Stinger would be discontinued in 2023. Along with the announcement they released the Stinger Tribute Edition. Based on the Stinger 3.3 petrol turbo GT trim, it has exclusive interior and exterior colors and design specifications, and is limited to 200 units in South Korea and 800 units overseas. The 19-inch wheels, exterior mirrors, and calipers are black, and the interior features a terracotta brown interior exclusive to the Tribute Edition. In addition, carbon-patterned materials are used on the top of the console and door garnish.

Powertrain

Marketing 
In June 2017, Kia Motors teamed up with GQ magazine to promote the Stinger as a "street style icon".

The Stinger GT was featured in series 2 episode 3 of The Grand Tour, where co-presenter James May raced it against two longboard riders on a mountain road in Majorca, with the car going uphill and the skateboarders going downhill.

On 4 February 2018, Kia released two Stinger commercials during Super Bowl LII. The first commercial features racing driver Emerson Fittipaldi. The second features Aerosmith lead vocalist Steven Tyler driving the car on an oval track in reverse until he becomes 40 years younger.

In January 2019, Kia announced a partnership with K-pop girl group Blackpink to promote the Stinger.

In June 2021, the judges of America Got Talent arrived to the show in two Kia Stinger GT2 2022.

Safety 
Euro NCAP
Euro NCAP test results for a LHD, 2.2-liter CRDi GT-Line 5-door fastback variant on a 2017 registration:

Police use 
In 2018, Queensland Police Service and Tasmania Police in Australia selected the Stinger 330SI as their new Road Policing car, replacing the discontinued Ford Falcon and Holden Commodore police cars.

Since 2019, the V6 variants of the Stinger have been utilised by SPEED police units in Poland. The unlabelled vehicles are used to monitor the safety on the roads; they are also used as pursuit vehicles.

In 2021, Merseyside Police started using the Stinger.

Awards 
The Stinger won the iF Product Design Award in the "Transportation Design" category and the Red Dot award in the "Best of the Best Car Design" category in 2018.

The Stinger won the 2018 MotorWeek Drivers' Choice Awards "Best of the Year".

Sales

References

External links 

Stinger
Cars introduced in 2017
2020s cars
Compact executive cars
Mid-size cars
Rear-wheel-drive vehicles
All-wheel-drive vehicles
Sports sedans
Hatchbacks
Luxury vehicles
Euro NCAP executive cars
Police vehicles